Petr Lexa (born 5 June 1991 České Budějovice) is a Czech singer and member of pop band Slza, which was formed in 2014. He is also active on YouTube under the nickname Hoggy and has appeared in the television series, Port.

Music career  
Lexa's interest in theatre began in primary school. He began acting lessons at a young age but decided to devote more time to music in 2009, when he recorded his first cover song and released it on YouTube.

Lexa took part in the Voice, Czech Republic and in Czech Superstar, and has won blogging awards.

YouTube 
Lexa's YouTube nickname, Hoggy, was based on Hogwarts. Slza bandmate Lukáš Bundil discovered him on the platform searching for a suitable vocalist.

By May 2016 Hoggy had over 650 000 subscribers.
 
He now uploads on the YouTube Channel Petr Lexa and has over 184,000 subscribers but does not have a schedule.

References 

Living people
1991 births
Slza members
Czech YouTubers
Musicians from České Budějovice